"Lovely Day" is a song by American soul and R&B singer Bill Withers. Written by Withers and Skip Scarborough, it was released on December 21, 1977, and appears on Withers's 1977 album Menagerie.  Withers holds a sustained note towards the end which, at 18 seconds long, is one of the longest ever recorded on an American pop song. The song was listed at No. 402 on Rolling Stones "Top 500 Best Songs of All Time" in 2021.

History
Released as a single in late 1977, "Lovely Day" peaked at number 6 on the Billboard R&B chart and at number 30 on the Billboard Hot 100 chart in the US in early 1978. It also made the Top 10 in the United Kingdom, where the song reached number 7 on the British single chart.

"Lovely Day" has been re-released as a single in the United Kingdom at least twice since the song's first chart run; in 1987 the original version charted again at number 92, while a remix done by Ben Liebrand, named the "Sunshine Mix", made the British Top 10 in 1988, rising to number 4. This remix resulted in renewed enthusiasm for the Withers original, which incurred a surge in airplay into the early 1990s and came to firmly overshadow the radio presence of Liebrand's version. Public interest was again piqued in 1995, when "Lovely Day" was used in adverts for Tetley tea, again in 1999 for a Gap commercial directed by Hype Williams, and yet again in 2020 in ads for Good Morning Football on NFL Network, Allstate insurance TV commercial, as well as an ad for Pandora Jewelers.  On January 20, 2021, the song was performed by Demi Lovato, with backing vocals from Lin-Manuel Miranda and several frontline healthcare workers amid the COVID-19 pandemic, as a part of the entertainment broadcast entitled Celebrating America following the inauguration of President Joe Biden.

Producer Clarence McDonald also arranged the original 1977 version of the song and played keyboards. Guitars were played by Ray Parker Jr., Jerry Knight played bass, and Russ Kunkel played drums.

Toward the end of the song Withers holds a note for 18 seconds, the longest of any Top 40 hit in the United States.

Personnel 
Bill Withers – vocals
Clarence McDonald – keyboards
Ray Parker Jr. – guitar
Jerry Knight – bass guitar
Russ Kunkel – drums, shaker
Ralph MacDonald – percussion
Charles Veal – concertmaster

Charts

Weekly charts

Year-end charts

Certifications

Covers
"Lovely Day" has been covered and sampled numerous times since Withers' original recording. Among the most notable is one by British pop group Central Line, appearing on their 1983 album Choice; this version reached number 81 on the UK Singles Chart. UK band Alt-J covered the song on their 2014 album This Is All Yours as a bonus track.

The S.O.U.L. S.Y.S.T.E.M. version

The song was covered by American R&B and dance music group The S.O.U.L. S.Y.S.T.E.M. featuring Michelle Visage, and was included on the soundtrack to the 1992 film The Bodyguard, starring Whitney Houston and Kevin Costner. This mostly rap version was titled "It's Gonna Be a Lovely Day". It reached number 34 on the US Billboard Hot 100 and number 44 on the Billboard R&B chart, in addition to spending three weeks atop the Billboard Hot Dance Club Play chart in December 1992 and January 1993. The song also reached number 17 on the UK Singles Chart and number two on the European Dance Radio Chart.

Critical reception
J.D. Considine from The Baltimore Sun remarked the "funk revisionism" of "It's Gonna Be a Lovely Day". In his weekly UK chart commentary, James Masterton wrote, "It's not the first time in recent years that the Bill Withers classic has had a chart outing, a remixed version having made the Top 10 in September 1988. The new version, however, is as far removed from this as can be and may just have enough novelty value not to be detracted by the cries of Sacrilege from the purists." Parry Gettelman from Orlando Sentinel viewed it as "a throwaway dance track". Charles Aaron for Spin said, "Clivilles & Cole's effortlessly escapist, double 12-inch extravaganza of house gimmicks is worth its price on packaging alone (the jacket could inspire a master's thesis). "Movin' the Crowd Club Mix" reintroduces Seduction's Michelle Visage, who boasts a breathy, offhand rhyme style, as if she's kickin' it in a fitting room at Bloomingdale's. The sample codes are less than fresh — Deee-Lite's "What Is Love?", Soul II Soul's "Get a Life", and a horn blast from Sly's "You Can Make It If You Try" — but together, they construct quite a club ethos."

Music video
A music video was produced to promote the single and was later published on YouTube in February 2014. It had generated more than 2 million views as of January 2023.

Charts

Soundtrack appearances

1980: This song is heard in the TV series "Great Railway Journeys of the World"- Season 1, Episode 2 "Coast to Coast".
2006: Jimmy Buffett's soundtrack for the movie Hoot sung by Maroon 5 featuring Bill and Kori Withers
2010: The song is featured in the film 127 Hours during the scene where James Franco (as Aron Ralston) on the second day of his horrific ordeal, makes a pulley to (unsuccessfully) release the rock trapping his arm. This song also features in the soundtrack of the movie.
2016: The song is featured toward the ending of the animated film The Secret Life of Pets, when the titular animals return home and happily reunite with their owners.
2019: The song is featured at the beginning of episode 1 of Ricky Gervais' Netflix series After Life.
2020: The song is featured in the main menu of the mobile game Lego Legacy: Heroes Unboxed by Gameloft
 2021: The song was featured in a Farxiga commercial
 2022: The song plays briefly at the beginning of Tyler Perry’s A Madea Homecoming.

See also
List of number-one dance hits (United States)
List of number-one dance hits (UK)

References

External links
 Withers original single info at discogs.com
 1988 "Sunshine Mix" info at discogs.com
 

1977 singles
1992 singles
2002 singles
Bill Withers songs
Sybil (singer) songs
Luther Vandross songs
Busta Rhymes songs
Diana Ross songs
Maroon 5 songs
Songs written by Bill Withers
Songs written by Skip Scarborough
1977 songs
Columbia Records singles
Funk songs
Jill Scott (singer) songs
Arista Records singles